Qatar-e Aghaj-e Sofla (also Romanized as Qaţār-e Āghāj-e Soflá; also known as Ghatar Aghaj, Qaţār Āghāj, and Qāţerqāj) is a village in Saruq Rural District, Saruq District, Farahan County, Markazi Province, Iran. At the 2006 census, its population was 228, in 53 families.

References 

Populated places in Farahan County